Lutyniec  is a settlement in the administrative district of Gmina Wronki, within Szamotuły County, Greater Poland Voivodeship, in west-central Poland.

The settlement has a population of 4.

References

Lutyniec